Kostaikha is a rural locality (a village) in Spasskoye Rural Settlement, Tarnogsky District, Vologda Oblast, Russia. The population was 43 as of 2002.

Geography 
Kostaikha is located 38 km northwest of Tarnogsky Gorodok (the district's administrative centre) by road. Naumovskaya is the nearest rural locality.

References 

Rural localities in Tarnogsky District